The Central African Republic women's national basketball team represents the Central African Republic in international competitions. It is administered by the Fédération Centrafricaine de Basketball.

FIBA Africa Championship record
1966 – 3rd place
1974 – 6th place
1977 – 9th place
2017 – 12th place

See also
Central African Republic women's national under-19 basketball team
Central African Republic women's national under-17 basketball team
Central African Republic women's national 3x3 team

References

External links
FIBA profile
Archived records of Central African Republic team participations

 
Women's national basketball teams
Basketball in the Central African Republic